The 1941 VFL Grand Final was an Australian rules football game contested between the Melbourne Football Club and Essendon Football Club, held at the Melbourne Cricket Ground in Melbourne on 27 September 1941. It was the 43rd annual Grand Final of the Victorian Football League, staged to determine the premiers for the 1940 VFL season. The match, attended by 79,687 spectators, was won by Melbourne by a margin of 29 points, marking that club's fifth premiership victory.

By claiming their third successive premiership, Melbourne joined Carlton and Collingwood as the only clubs to achieve the feat.

Melbourne's team was understrength as they had been depleted by the war. Syd Anderson, Harold Ball, Ron Barassi and Keith Truscott, who were members of the previous season's premiership, missed the Grand Final as they were serving their country and all died in World War II.

There were sets of brothers on each team, with the Cordner brothers of Melbourne taking on the Reynolds brothers of Essendon.

Teams

Statistics

Goalkickers

References
1941 Grand Final stats page on AFL Tables
 The Official statistical history of the AFL 2004 
 Ross, J. (ed), 100 Years of Australian Football 1897–1996: The Complete Story of the AFL, All the Big Stories, All the Great Pictures, All the Champions, Every AFL Season Reported, Viking, (Ringwood), 1996.

See also
 1941 VFL season

VFL/AFL Grand Finals
Grand
Melbourne Football Club
Essendon Football Club
September 1941 sports events